A towhee is any one of a number of species of birds in the genus Pipilo or Melozone within the family Passerellidae (which also includes American sparrows, and juncos).

Towhees typically have longer tails than other Passerellidae.  Most species tend to avoid humans, so they are not well known, though the eastern towhee P. erythrophthalmus is bolder.  This species, and some others, may be seen in urban parks and gardens.

There has been considerable debate over the taxonomy of the towhees in recent years. Two species complexes have been identified, the rufous-sided complex (involving Pipilo erythrophthalmus, P. maculatus, P. socorroensis, P. ocai and P. chlorurus), and the brown towhee complex (involving Melozone crissalis, M. fuscus, M. aberti and M. albicollis). The distinction of species within these is uncertain and opinions have differed over the years. Modern authorities distinguish all four species in the brown towhee complex, though M. fuscus and M. crissalis were formerly treated as a single species. Hybrids are frequent between some of the species, particularly between the Mexican races of P. maculatus ("olive-backed towhee", P. m. macronyx) and P. ocai.

Genus Melozone:
 Abert's towhee (Melozone aberti)
 California towhee (Melozone crissalis),
 Canyon towhee (Melozone fusca)
 White-throated towhee (Melozone leucotis)

Genus Pipilo:
 Green-tailed towhee (Pipilo chlorurus),
 Collared towhee (Pipilo ocai),
 Eastern towhee (Pipilo erythrophthalmus),
 Spotted towhee (Pipilo maculatus),
 Bermuda towhee (Pipilo naufragus) — extinct

References

External links
Towhee videos, photos and sounds on the Internet Bird Collection

Pipilo
Melozone
Bird common names